Toby Haynes is a British television director, notable for his work on Doctor Who, Sherlock, Being Human, Black Mirror, and Jonathan Strange & Mr Norrell. He also directed the Channel 4/HBO television film Brexit: The Uncivil War.

He is a graduate of the National Film and Television School, and an alumnus of Falmouth University.

He won the Hugo Award for Best Dramatic Presentation (Short Form) for the Doctor Who's episodes "The Pandorica Opens" and "The Big Bang" (2010).

Filmography

Television

Film
 Brexit: The Uncivil War (2019)

References

External links

Toby Haynes Profile at the Curtis Brown Agency

Living people
British television directors
Alumni of Falmouth University
Hugo Award winners
Year of birth missing (living people)
Alumni of the National Film and Television School